Watts Branch is the name of some streams in the United States:

 Watts Branch (Anacostia River), Prince George's County, Maryland and Washington, D.C.
 Watts Branch (Potomac River), Montgomery County, Maryland
 Watts Branch (Missouri), a stream in Missouri